Loll may refer to:

 Renate Loll, physicist
 Sven Loll (born 1964), German judoka Olympic medalist 
 Angle of loll, a specific hydrostatic stability condition experienced by unstable vessels at sea

See also 
 LOL
 Lol (disambiguation)